James Wheeler (March 21, 1793 – February 20, 1854) was an American politician who served in the Michigan House of Representatives immediately following adoption of the state's first constitution.

Biography 

James Wheeler was born in Saratoga County, New York, on March 21, 1793. He later lived in Wheeler, New York, a town which was named after his family.

In 1834, Wheeler settled and farmed in Tecumseh, Michigan. He was elected as a Democrat to the Michigan House of Representatives in 1835, and served as a justice from 1837 to 1841.

He died in Tecumseh on February 20, 1854.

Notes

References 
 
 

1793 births
1854 deaths
Democratic Party members of the Michigan House of Representatives
People from Saratoga County, New York
People from Wheeler, New York
People from Tecumseh, Michigan
19th-century American politicians